Carlos María Ramírez (1847–1898) was a Uruguayan journalist, essayist and politician. He was Minister of Finance from 1891 to 1892. 

Son of Juan Pedro Ramírez Carrasco and Consolación Álvarez y Obes; brother of José Pedro, Julio, Juan Augusto, Octavio, and Gonzalo Ramírez.

He was a member of the Constitutional Party.

References

External links
 Carlos María Ramírez, founder of the Athenaeum of Montevideo 

1847 births
1898 deaths
Uruguayan people of Spanish descent
People from Rio Grande do Sul
Ministers of Economics and Finance of Uruguay
Constitutional Party (Uruguay) politicians
University of the Republic (Uruguay) alumni
Academic staff of the University of the Republic (Uruguay)
Uruguayan scholars of constitutional law
Uruguayan journalists
Uruguayan essayists
19th-century journalists
Male journalists
Male essayists
19th-century male writers
19th-century essayists